Wang Jinping is the name of:

Wang Jinping (scholar and activist) (1946–2019), Taiwanese social activist
Wang Jinping (biathlete) (born 1971), Chinese biathlete
Wang Jinping (sprinter) (born 1987), Chinese sprinter

See also
Wang Jin-pyng (born 1941), Taiwanese politician